Maple Shorts is a children's television show produced by March Entertainment, producers of the TV show, Chilly Beach. Maple Shorts debuted in April 2005 and aired on the CBC Television.

Maple Shorts is hosted by a goose and a salmon. Canuckles is a cranky, conceited Canada goose who wanted to direct but settled for being a critic instead. Sela the salmon is Canuckles' bubble-headed, sweet-natured co-host. Together, they critique each short film which airs on the program.

Maple Shorts is the second broadcast television show produced by March Entertainment. Chilly Beach, the company's most popular show, started out as an Internet show using Flash animation.

March Entertainment, founded in 1996, also produces the Maple Shorts Canadian Animators' Flash Film Festival. The festival feeds higher-quality submissions onto the television show, and is used as a developmental vehicle for up-and-coming animators.

Episodes

Waiting for Schtumpenflugenburgermeyr 13 April 2005
The Legend of the Headless Usher 20 April 2005
Goose Encounters of the Third Kind 30 April 2005
What's Good for the Goose 4 May 2005

External links
 

2000s Canadian animated television series
2005 Canadian television series debuts
2006 Canadian television series endings
Canadian children's animated television series
CBC Television original programming
Canadian flash animated television series
Animated television series about ducks
Animated television series about fish
Television shows filmed in Greater Sudbury